Abdul Rahim Dawood is a Kenyan businessman who was elected as a member of the Kenyan Parliament in the 2013 parliamentary elections.

References

External links

Living people
Kenyan businesspeople
Alliance Party of Kenya politicians
Members of the 11th Parliament of Kenya
Alumni of Aga Khan Academy, Nairobi
Kenya Methodist University alumni
Kenyan politicians of Indian descent
1965 births